Ben Thompson (born 4 October 1978) is a former Australian rules footballer who played for the Carlton Football Club in the Australian Football League.

References
Holmesby, Russell & Main, Jim (2009). The Encyclopedia of AFL Footballers. 8th ed. Melbourne: Bas Publishing.

External links

Ben Thomson's profile at Blueseum

Carlton Football Club players
Living people
1978 births
Australian rules footballers from Queensland
Kedron Grange Football Club players
Zillmere Eagles Australian Football Club players